The Phantom Cowboy is a 1941 American Western film directed by George Sherman and written by Doris Schroeder. The film stars Don "Red" Barry, Virginia Carroll, Milburn Stone, Neyle Morrow, Rex Lease and Nick Thompson. The film was released on February 14, 1941, by Republic Pictures.

Plot

Cast 
Don "Red" Barry as Jim Lawrence
Virginia Carroll as Elanita Toreno
Milburn Stone as Stan Borden
Neyle Morrow as Miguel Garcia (El Lobo) 
Rex Lease as Sheriff Ben Jeffers
Nick Thompson as Pancho
Bud Osborne as Dreer
Ernest Wilson as Memphis
Burr Caruth as Lawyer Eric Motley

References

External links
 

1941 films
1940s English-language films
American Western (genre) films
1941 Western (genre) films
Republic Pictures films
Films directed by George Sherman
American black-and-white films
1940s American films